Amy Brown may refer to:

 Amy Brown (dietitian), Welsh professor of child public health at Swansea University
 Amy Brown (royal mistress) (1783–1876), English mistress of Charles Ferdinand, Duke of Berry